Ladislav Ženíšek (7 March 1904 in Vinohrady – 14 May 1985) was a Czech football defender and later a football manager. He played 22 matches for Czechoslovakia.

He was a participant in the 1934 FIFA World Cup, where Czechoslovakia won the silver medal.

In his country he played mostly for Viktoria Žižkov and Slavia Prague.

As a football manager he coached several teams, including Viktoria Žižkov, as well as the Czechoslovak national team.

References 
 

1904 births
1985 deaths
Czech footballers
Czechoslovak footballers
SK Slavia Prague players
FK Viktoria Žižkov players
Czech football managers
Czechoslovak football managers
Association football defenders
1934 FIFA World Cup players
Czechoslovakia international footballers
Dukla Prague managers
Czechoslovakia national football team managers
Bohemians 1905 managers
FK Viktoria Žižkov managers
FK Vítkovice managers
Footballers from Prague
People from the Kingdom of Bohemia